Joanna Hofman (born 12 August 1967, in Mrągowo) is a Polish actress and diplomat; ambassador to Finland (2007–2011) and Sweden (since 2020).

Life 
Hofman graduated in 1990 from Acting Department at the Aleksander Zelwerowicz National Academy of Dramatic Art in Warsaw. She wrote her thesis on Scandinavian literature. Nine years later she finished also international relations at the University of Warsaw, as well as postgraduate studies on national security. In 2005, she did postgraduate diploma at the Academy of National Defence, Warsaw.

From 1990 to 1992 she was actress at the Comedy Theatre of Warsaw, and also cooperated with Polish Television and Polish Radio. She has been playing in movies, TV series, television plays.

In 2002, Hofman joined the Ministry of Foreign Affairs of Poland as head of the unit for contacts with Jewish diaspora. In 2003, she participated in the "International Visitor Program of the United States Department of State". From 2005 to 2007 she was posted at the embassy in Washington as a counsellor. Between 2007 and 2011, she served as ambassador to Finland. In June 2011, she became vice-president for corporate relations and international affairs of the Finnish company Fortum Corporation. Since 2014 she was representing the company in Turkey. From 2017 to 2020 she was director of the Polish Institute in Tel Aviv. In January 2020 she was nominated ambassador to Sweden, beginning her term on 5 March 2020.

Besides Polish, Hofman speaks English, and Russian.

Filmography 

 1990: Mów mi Rockefeller
 1993: Wow (episodes 4, 10)
 1993: Łowca. Ostatnie starcie
 1993: Czterdziestolatek. 20 lat później (episodes 3, 6, 8)
 1994: Spółka rodzinna (episodes 7, 8)
 1994: Panna z mokrą głową (movie)
 1994: Panna z mokrą głową (series, episode 6)
 1995: Sortez des rangs

source

Honours 

 First Class Commander of the Order of the White Rose of Finland (2011)

References 

1967 births
Aleksander Zelwerowicz National Academy of Dramatic Art in Warsaw alumni
Ambassadors of Poland to Finland
Ambassadors of Poland to Sweden
Living people
People from Mrągowo
Polish film actresses
Polish stage actresses
University of Warsaw alumni
Polish women ambassadors